Jarkko Laukia is a Finnish sport shooter who won the 2019 IPSC Rifle World Shoot Open division title and 2018 IPSC Shotgun World Shoot Standard division title.
Jarkko has 21 Finnish championships title from different IPSC Divisions, 6 time Steel Challenge Finnish Champion and 7 Finnish championships title from SRA-shooting. Jarkko has won over 70 President's Medals from Level 3 to Level 5 IPSC competitions

See also 
 Raine Peltokoski, Finnish sport shooter
 Josh Froelich, American sport shooter
 Roberto Vezzoli, Italian sport shooter

References

External links 
 Official Facebook page

Year of birth missing (living people)
Living people
IPSC shooters
Finnish male sport shooters
Place of birth missing (living people)